The Tonga national rugby union team represents Tonga in men's international rugby union. The team is nicknamed Ikale Tahi (Sea Eagles). Like their Polynesian neighbours, the Tongans start their matches with a traditional piece of performance art – the Sipi Tau. They are members of the Pacific Islands Rugby Alliance (PIRA) along with Fiji and Samoa. The Ikale Tahi achieved a historic 19–14 victory over France in the 2011 Rugby World Cup, but having lost to New Zealand and Canada, were unable to achieve what would have been their first-ever presence at the quarter-finals.

History

Rugby was brought to the region in the early 20th century by sailors and missionaries, and the Tonga Rugby Football Union was formed in late 1923. Tonga beat Fiji 9–6 in their first test in 1924 played in the capital Nukualofa. However, Tonga lost the second test 14–3 and drew the decider 0–0.

Between 1924 and 1938 Tonga and Fiji played three test series every alternate year. Matches between the two Pacific nations were hard fought; many have claimed that the ancient feuding wars between the Islanders were transplanted onto the rugby field. Troubles during the third Test of Fiji's 1928 tour to Tonga forced the game to be abandoned with Tonga leading 11–8. In 1954 Tonga played host to a touring Western Samoa.

Tonga beat New Zealand Maori in 1969, but had to wait until 1973 before they played their second test match, a 30–12 defeat against Australia in Sydney. They got their revenge when they beat Australia in Ballymore, Brisbane 16–11, scoring four tries to two in June 1973. The following year they traveled to the Arms Park for a non-cap international against Wales, a game that ended in a 26–7 defeat.

The first Tongan tour to Great Britain was in 1974, when they played 10 games, including those in Wales against East Wales, Llanelli, North Wales, Newport, West Wales and a Wales XV. The only tour victory was by 18–13 in the opener against East Wales. The 'tests' were lost by 44–8 to a Scotland XV and by 26–7 to the Wales XV.

They remained a little-known quantity in Europe until 1986, when Wales embarked on a tour of Fiji, Tonga and Western Samoa. Early in the game against Tonga, Welsh flanker Mark Brown was knocked over by three Tongan forwards, leading to a mass brawl involving the entire team except Malcolm Dacey and Mark Titley. Robert Jones describes the event in his book Raising The Dragon as "the worst brawl I have ever seen on a rugby field." At the post-match dinner Jonathan Davies was asked to give a few words in Welsh and as the hosts politely applauded he described them as "the dirtiest team I have ever played against"

Tonga were drawn to play Wales again in the inaugural 1987 Rugby World Cup in New Zealand. The previous meeting, plus the decision to rest some of the leading players, led to a poor Welsh performance though they managed to win 29–16. Tonga lost its other two games to Ireland (32–9) and Canada (37–4).

They failed to qualify for the 1991 Rugby World Cup. In 1994 they won the South Pacific championship on try count and so qualified for the Super 10, in which they finished bottom of their pool with only one point.

They qualified for the 1995 World Cup ahead of Fiji on points difference. Tonga managed only two victories in the next two World Cups, against the 29–11 Côte d'Ivoire in 1995 and Italy in 1999. The win over the Côte d'Ivoire brought tragedy when Ivorian winger Max Brito was left paralyzed.

June 1999 brought a 20–16 defeat of France in Nukualofa over a touring France but in 2000 they were defeated 102–0 (including 15 tries) by New Zealand.

After losing their first four matches to Fiji and Samoa, Tonga finished third in the Oceania qualifying group. As a result, they had to play home and away matches against Papua New Guinea, which they won 47–14 and 84–12, followed by a play-off against South Korea, who finished as runners-up in the Asian section. Tonga thrashed them 75–0 and 119–0.

At the 2003 Rugby World Cup Tonga lost all their games and finished bottom of their pool. Although they kept Wales to 20–27, they were again thrashed by New Zealand 91–7.

In 2007 Tonga participated in the 2007 Rugby World Cup, winning two of their pool matches and nearly defeating the eventual champions, South Africa, before losing 30–25.

Tonga achieved one of the most unexpected victories in Rugby World Cup history with their 19–14 win over France in the 2011 World Cup.

On 24 November 2012, Tonga beat Scotland, at Pittodrie Stadium, 21–15 for their first victory over a traditional rugby power on a European pitch.

Sipi Tau

Like several Pacific rugby nations, Tonga has a pre-game war dance, called the Sipi Tau. It is a form of the Kailao, which was originally a war dance that was imported to Tonga from Wallis Island. It is usually performed at both public and private ceremonies.

During the 2003 Rugby World Cup in Australia, in Tonga's match against the All Blacks, the All Blacks began their traditional haka, and then Tonga answered to the haka through the sipi tau whilst the All Blacks were performing, bringing the teams within metres of one another just prior to kick-off.

Wins against Tier 1 nations

Overall record

Below is table of the representative rugby matches played by a Tongan national XV at test level up until 23 July 2022.

World Cup record

Players

Current squad
On 7 October, the following 30 players were called up for the 2022 end-of-year rugby union internationals.

Head Coach:  Toutai Kefu
 Caps Updated: 6 November 2022

Coaches

Current coaching staff
The current coaching staff of the Tongan national team:

Individual all-time records

Most caps

Last updated: Tonga vs Uruguay, 19 November 2022. Statistics include officially capped matches only.

Most tries

Last updated: Tonga vs Uruguay, 19 November 2022. Statistics include officially capped matches only.

Leading point scorers

Last updated: Tonga vs Uruguay, 19 November 2022. Statistics include officially capped matches only.

Most points in a match

Last updated: Tonga vs Uruguay, 19 November 2022. Statistics include officially capped matches only.

Most tries in a match

Last updated: Tonga vs Uruguay, 19 November 2022. Statistics include officially capped matches only.

Most matches as captain

Last updated: Tonga vs Uruguay, 19 November 2022. Statistics include officially capped matches only.

Youngest players

Last updated: Tonga vs Uruguay, 19 November 2022. Statistics include officially capped matches only.

Oldest players

Last updated: Tonga vs Uruguay, 19 November 2022. Statistics include officially capped matches only.

Kit history
Tonga usually wears a home kit consisting of a red shirt, white shorts and red socks and an away kit with the reversed colours. In the 1999 Rugby World Cup, Tonga wore an all-red home kit. Since 2007, Tongan traditional designs, similar to the ones found on the tapa cloths, were incorporated on the jersey design.

Kit manufacturers:
1974–1980s Umbro
1980s–1999 Canterbury
2000–2002 Carisbrook
2003–2005 Sekem
2005–2008 KooGa
2008 Samurai Sportswear
2008–2010 Aoniu
2011–2012 KooGa/BLK
2012–2015 Kukri
2016–2020 Mizuno
June 2021-November 2021 Siomai Print
November 2021-present Force XV
 Tonga wore Samurai Sportswear kits in the matches against Maori All Blacks and Japan in 2008
 Tonga wore kits manufactured by the local brand Aoniu in the 2008 end-of-year international tours.

Coaches

Notable former players

 Inoke Afeaki
 Stanley Afeaki
 Sona Taumalolo
 Ipolito Fenukitau
 Salesi Finau
 Soane Tongaʻuiha
 Taufaʻao Filise

 Aisea Havili
 Pierre Hola
 Benhur Kivalu
 Nili Latu
 Sililo Martens
 Maama Molitika
 Mana Otai
 Siale Piutau

 Hale T-Pole
 Lisiate Tafa
 Epi Taione
 Josh Taumalolo
 Sateki Tuipulotu

See also

 Tonga national rugby league team
 World Cup
 Pacific Tri-Nations
 Pacific Nations Cup
 2008 IRB Pacific Nations Cup
 Pacific Islanders rugby union team
 Tonga Rugby Football Union

Notes

Sources
 Tongan rugby history (from the BBC)
 The good and bad of Tonga (from the BBC)

External links
 Official site
 Tongan rugby union news from Planet Rugby
 Tongan Rugby News
 Details on Rugby WC's squads
 World Cup Preview
 Supporters website of The Pacific Islanders Rugby Team

 
Oceanian national rugby union teams